It's Personal with Amy Hoggart is an American comedy television series starring Amy Hoggart. The series premiered on TruTV on February 26, 2020.

Episodes

References

External links
 

2020s American comedy television series
2020 American television series debuts
English-language television shows
TruTV original programming
American television spin-offs